Paulo Cheang Cheng Ieong (born 18 August 1984) is a Macanese professional footballer. He plays as a midfielder and is the captain and record cap-holder of the Macau national football team.

Career
Cheang's club career began playing for Macau giants C.D. Monte Carlo , where he first played in the 2004–05 season. while at the club, his team occupied respectively the third position (2004–05 season), second (season 2005–06) and fourth (season 2006–07), and in the 2007–08 season C.D. Monte Carlo won the title. After this success, Cheang moved to the club Windsor Arch Ka I , whom in the 2008–09 he guided to win the title after a late January transfer move. In 2010, he arrived for a short stint at G.D. Lam Pak, where he played 7 games before leaving for C.D. Monte Carlo, a team he still played for 6 years later.

References 

1984 births
Living people
Macau footballers
Association football midfielders
Macau international footballers
C.D. Monte Carlo players
windsor Arch Ka I players
G.D. Lam Pak players